Ian MacLeod (19 November 1959 – 6 May 2013) was a Scottish footballer who played as a defender.

MacLeod started his career with Motherwell F.C. in 1978 and went to make 243 appearances for the Fir Park club. He also played for Falkirk, Raith Rovers and Meadowbank Thistle

MacLeod died on 6 May 2013, aged 53.

References

1959 births
2013 deaths
Scottish footballers
Motherwell F.C. players
Falkirk F.C. players
Raith Rovers F.C. players
Livingston F.C. players
Larkhall Thistle F.C. players
Scottish Football League players
Sportspeople from East Kilbride
Association football fullbacks
Association football midfielders
Footballers from South Lanarkshire